Dardanus pedunculatus, the anemone hermit crab, is a species of hermit crab from the Indo-Pacific region. It lives at depths of up to 27 m and collects sea anemones to place on its shell for defence.

Distribution
Dardanus pedunculatus has a broad distribution in the Indo-Pacific region, from the Seychelles in the west to Japan and Hawaii in the east. In Australia, it is found from New South Wales (as far south at Port Jackson) to Queensland.

Ecology
It usually carries sea anemones on its shell, which it uses to protect itself from its main predator, cephalopods of the genus Octopus. The anemones are collected at night, and comprises the crab stroking and tapping the anemone until it loosens its grip on the substrate, at which point it is moved onto the gastropod shell that the hermit crab inhabits.

Description
The carapace is mottled in tan and cream, while the eyestalks are white with red bands. The sexes are similar. The left claw is much larger than the right claw.

Pets
Hermit crabs are popular pets in marine aquaria, and Dardanus pedunculatus is occasionally kept, although the species has not been successfully reared in captivity.

Taxonomic history
Dardanus pedunculatus was first described by Johann Friedrich Wilhelm Herbst as Cancer pedunculatus, in his 1804 work ; the type locality is not known.
It has since been placed in a number of different genera, including Pagurus and Neopagurus, and a number of taxonomic synonyms have been created.

References

External links
 

Hermit crabs
Symbiosis
Crustaceans described in 1804